This is a list of Maldivian Twenty20 International cricketers.

In April 2018, the ICC decided to grant full Twenty20 International (T20I) status to all its members. Therefore, all Twenty20 matches played between Maldives and other ICC members after 1 January 2019 will have T20I status.

This list comprises all members of the Maldives cricket team who have played at least one T20I match. It is initially arranged in the order in which each player won his first Twenty20 cap. Where more than one player won his first Twenty20 cap in the same match, those players are listed alphabetically by surname.

Key

List of players
Statistics are correct as of 9 July 2022.

References 

 
Maldives
Cricket